MSPL Limited  is an Indian company that operates iron ore mines and wind farms. It is a subsidiary of the Baldota Group.

Iron Mining 

MSPL mines, processes and exports iron ore. According to the Federation of Indian Mineral Industries, It was the first private company in India to receive a license for export of high grade ore containing at least 64% iron.

Wind energy 
MSPL operates wind farms in the Indian states of Karnataka, Maharashtra, Rajasthan and Gujarat. Their total installed capacity was 191.6 MW in 2007 according to the Directory of Indian Wind Power Its wind power operations have been used in Clean Development Mechanism (CDM) projects to create Certified Emission Reduction credits (CERs).

Awards 
MSPL was awarded the CFBP-Jamnalal Bajaj Uchit Vyavahar Puraskar in the Large Manufacturer category in 2007. and in the same year received the First Prize for Independent Power Producer under Wind Programme from the Ministry of New and Renewable Energy.
In 2005, the Group received the KREDL award for the highest investment and production in wind power. For planting over 1.6 Million trees MSPL received the 2004 Indira Priyadarshni Vriuksha Mitra Award.

References

External links 
 MSPL Limited
 http://economictimes.indiatimes.com/Chidamabaram_asks_industry_to_help_inclusive_growth/articleshow/3047073.cms
 http://economictimes.indiatimes.com/articleshow/2562618.cms
 http://economictimes.indiatimes.com/MSPL_to_invest_over_Rs_18K_cr_for_capacity_expansion/articleshow/2190870.cms
 http://economictimes.indiatimes.com/articleshowarchive.cms?msid=2230089
 https://web.archive.org/web/20080519120540/http://www.businessworld.in/content/view/4672/4779

Non-renewable resource companies established in 1961
Iron ore mining companies of India
Electric power companies of India
Companies based in Mumbai
Wind power companies
Energy companies established in 1961
Renewable resource companies established in 1961
Indian companies established in 1961
1961 establishments in Maharashtra